Sōshi-kaimei (創氏改名) was a policy of pressuring Koreans under Japanese rule to adopt Japanese names.  It consisted of two parts.  Ordinance No. 19, issued in 1939, required sōshi, literally "creation of a (see ).  Ordinance No. 20, issued in 1940, permitted kaimei, change of one's given name; this was voluntary but those who did not change their names were severely disadvantaged.

These ordinances, issued by General Jirō Minami, Governor-General of Korea, effectively reversed an earlier government order which forbade Koreans to take up Japanese names.  There are various explanations for the purpose of the ordinances.

Order No. 124 

In 1909, the Korean Empire established a civil registration law, starting the creation of a modern family registry system. With regard to the recording of details about women such as the father's surname, age, and connection to the registry holder, due to attention that needed to be given to avoiding conflict with Korean customs, the drafting of the law was not completed until April 1910, just before the annexation of Korea. By that time, a portion of Koreans had already registered Japanese-style names and the like, which generated confusion. As a result, on the basis of memoranda such as Order No. 124, "Document regarding name changes by Koreans" issued by the Governor-General of Korea on November 11, 1911, the use by Koreans of "names which might be mistaken for those of native Japanese" was no longer permitted, and strict controls were placed on the registration of Japanese-style names for newborn children. Additionally, Koreans who had registered Japanese-style names there were required to revert to their original names.

Ordinances No. 19 and 20 

In 1939 and 1940, a new name-change policy came into effect by means of Ordinances No. 19 and 20. Originally, as in Taiwan, the new name-change policy was intended simply to allow change of surname (sei/seong) and given name, but because Korea had a long-established custom (recently abandoned) whereby people of the same bon-gwan (surname and clan) were not allowed to marry each other, in order that this custom could continue, it was decided that the policy would be implemented by leaving the clan name and sei the same in the family register while permitting a new family name (shi/ssi) to be registered. On the other hand, in Taiwan, which was also under Japanese rule in the same period, but did not have an analogous custom, the policy was not described as the "creation of a shi", but was simply .

In the half-year between February 11 and August 10, 1940, those who provided notification could create a shi of their own choosing, while those who did not provide any notification would have their shi defined by the clan name (sei) of the head of the household. After the "creation of a family name", a Korean had three names which are a family name shi, a clan name sei, and a personal name mei (first name), all of which are recorded in a person's family register along with the origin place of the clan, bon-gwan. Since all members of a family share the same family name shi, the wife's shi, and hence the first character in her legal name, would be the same as her husband's, which differed from the traditional Korean clan name sei, whereby a wife kept her original sei even after marriage (see table). Besides that, selection of a shi with a Japanese-style reading could also be approved; to go along with such a shi, it was also permissible to change one's given name to a Japanese-style name; as the change of given name was voluntary, a fee would be charged for it. This case was also included in the sōshi-kaimei policy.

Declaration of individually selected shi and changes of given name initially (in February 1940) were conducted on the basis of voluntary notification. However, at the April prefectural governors' meeting, because of instructions such as "Special consideration should be taken so that the shi registration of all households can be completed by the coming July 20" the administration began to seriously promote the policy, and as a result, starting from April, the number of households registering individually selected shi began to rise sharply. As of April, only 3.9% of all households had provided notification for the creation of a shi, but by August 10, that figure had risen to 80.3%. Also, statements opposing the policy of sōshi-kaimei were censored according to the internal security laws. 

There are several viewpoints regarding this sudden increase. Most argue that official compulsion and harassment existed against individuals who would not create a new Japanese-style shi, but disagree whether this was the result of individual unauthorized practices by low-level officials , the policy of some regional government organizations, or an overall intention of the colonial government. Others argue that Koreans seeking to avoid discrimination by the Japanese voluntarily created Japanese-style family names.

Regardless, of Koreans living in Korea, the proportion of those who changed their given name reached only 9.6%. Among Koreans living in mainland of Japan, the proportion of those who created a new shi by individual selection reached 14.2％.

Restoration of original names 

After the liberation of Korea from Japanese rule, the Name Restoration Order was issued on October 23, 1946, by the United States military administration south of the 38th parallel, enabling Koreans to restore their Korean names if they wished to. However, not all Koreans returned to using their original names, especially Koreans living outside of Korea. Many Zainichi Koreans chose to retain their Japanese names, either to avoid discrimination, or later, to meet the requirements for naturalization as Japanese citizens, while some Sakhalin Koreans who had taken Japanese names were registered by Soviet authorities under those names (which appeared on their Japanese identity papers) after the Red Army occupied Karafuto, and up to the  have been unable to revert their legal names to their original Korean ones.

Name registration of prominent individuals

Those who took a Japanese-style name 
 Kim Suk-won, a.k.a. Kaneyama Shakugen, Major General in the Imperial Japanese Army
 Park Chung-hee, a.k.a. Takagi Masao, Lieutenant in the army of Manchukuo, later president of South Korea
 Lee Myung-bak, a.k.a. Tsukiyama Akihiro, former president of South Korea
 Kim Dae-jung, a.k.a. Toyota Daiju, former president of South Korea

Those who retained their Korean-style name 
 Hong Sa-ik, Lieutenant General in the Imperial Japanese Army
 Pak Chun-geum, member of the House of Representatives (see Japanese Wikipedia article)
 Han Sang-ryong, member of the House of Peers (see Korean Wikipedia article)
 Yi Gi-yong, member of the House of Peers

Timeline of family registration procedures in Korea 

 The application period for the creation of a SSI was limited to six months in length, while there was no time limit placed on the change of given name
 Children inherited their father's bon-gwan and seong
 Children of an unmarried woman inherited the woman's bon-gwan and Seong
 Even if one married, the recorded native region and clan name could not be changed
 According to customary Korean law (now no longer followed), one can not marry a person of the same clan name and the same clan origin related within 6 or 8 degrees

See also 
Japanese name
Korean name
Koreans in Japan
Ethnic issues in Japan
Legislation on Chinese Indonesians
Final Solution of the Czech Question
Cultural genocide

Notes

References 
 
 
 
  Footnote 16 gives bibliographic references for Korean perspectives on the Soshi-Kaimei policy. 

Korea under Japanese rule
1939 in Korea
1939 in law
Anti-Korean sentiment in Japan
Japanese imperialism and colonialism
Legal history of Japan
Japanese names
Cultural assimilation